Toronto Airport Express was a bus service operated by Pacific Western Transportation under a contract with the Greater Toronto Airports Authority to operate express bus services between Toronto Pearson International Airport and downtown Toronto. The service was discontinued in October 2014 for a variety of reasons, including anticipated opening of the Union Pearson Express, a rail link connecting the airport to downtown Toronto.

History 
It was established in 1993, after the demise of the previous service provider, Gray Coach. The service operated 20 hours a day, 7 days a week, 365 days a year. It ran at 20-minute intervals during peak times and 30-minute intervals off-peak.

Airport Express (and Gray Coach before them) formerly operated two additional routes, one connecting the airport to Islington subway station and the other to Yorkdale and York Mills stations. These were withdrawn in 2000 after the TTC introduced a competing express bus service from Kipling station, which charges regular TTC fares but until 2013 used regular TTC buses with no space intended for luggage.

In June 2011, Toronto Airport Express began a connecting, on-demand service called Airport Express Connect that extended the regular scheduled service throughout downtown Toronto. Pacific Western was named the IMG Operator of the Year for 2010. Coach 1559 had a new wrap reflecting this honour, replacing the Young Explorers wrap that had been on this bus.

Closure 
The service ceased operation on October 31, 2014 due to declining ridership, which had fallen from 400,000 to 190,000 in ten years. The decline was attributed to the popularity of the Billy Bishop airport and delays due to downtown road construction. The closure of the service was in anticipation of the Union Pearson Express rail service which began operation in 2015. Staff and buses were re-deployed back into Pacific Western's other operations in Toronto.

In response to the closure of Pacific Western's service, the Toronto Transit Commission enhanced its Route 900 Airport Express express bus service between Kipling subway station and the airport by retrofitting buses with luggage racks and increasing the frequency of buses on the route.

Route
There were nine downtown Toronto destinations:
 Westin Harbour Castle Hotel (Queen's Quay East and Bay Street)
 Fairmont Royal York/Strathcona Hotel (Front Street West and York Street)
 InterContinental Toronto Centre (Simcoe Street and Front Street West)
 Holiday Inn on King (King Street West and Peter Street)
 Sheraton Centre (Queen Street West and York Street)
 Metropolitan Hotel / Chestnut Residence (U of T) (Dundas Street West and Chestnut Street)
 Toronto Bus Terminal (Elizabeth Street and Edward Street) - starting terminal
 Chelsea Hotel (Gerrard Street West and Yonge Street)
 Bond Place (Dundas Street East and Bond Street)

The route took about 1 hour and 10 minutes without accounting traffic delays.

Fleet
The Airport Express used H345 Prevost Car 45' motor coaches with seating for 56. They were powered by engines that produce 55 per cent less nitrogen oxide and 90 per cent less particulate matter than the previous models. The coaches also come with improved features including such as leather seats, free WiFi internet, laptop plugs and retractable seat belts.

See also
 Greater Toronto Airports Authority
 Toronto Pearson International Airport

References

External links
 Pacific Western Toronto
 Pacific Western Calgary
 GTAA
 Airport Express
 Video: Toronto travellers, your options for getting to Pearson Airport are about to get more limited

Transport in Toronto
Toronto Pearson International Airport
Defunct transport companies of Canada
Airport bus services